Timocratica bicornuta is a moth in the family Depressariidae. It was described by Vitor O. Becker in 1982. It is found in Brazil (Rio de Janeiro) and French Guiana.

References

Moths described in 1982
Taxa named by Vitor Becker
Timocratica